Foster McGowan Voorhees (November 5, 1856 – June 14, 1927) was an American Republican Party politician, who served as the 30th governor of New Jersey from 1899 to 1902.

Biography
Voorhees represented Union County in the New Jersey Senate from 1895 to 1898. As President of the Senate, he became acting governor briefly in 1898 when John W. Griggs resigned to become the Attorney General of the United States and again as an elected governor from 1899 to 1902. He was a New Jersey delegate to the 1900 Republican National Convention in Philadelphia, Pennsylvania. He died of chronic myocarditis on his farm in High Bridge, New Jersey and was interred at Riverside Cemetery in Clinton, New Jersey. Voorhees was of Dutch descent.

Legacy
New Jersey's Voorhees Township, Voorhees High School, Voorhees dorm at Rutgers and Voorhees State Park, his former farm, are named in his honor.

See also 
List of governors of New Jersey

References

External links
Biography of Foster MacGowan Voorhees (PDF), New Jersey State Library
Political Graveyard biography
Dead Governors of New Jersey bio for Foster M. Voorhees

1856 births
1927 deaths
People from Clinton, New Jersey
American Presbyterians
American people of Dutch descent
Republican Party governors of New Jersey
Presidents of the New Jersey Senate
Republican Party New Jersey state senators
New Jersey lawyers
Rutgers University alumni
People from High Bridge, New Jersey
Foster M.
19th-century American lawyers
19th-century American politicians
20th-century American politicians